Kelsey Elizabeth McJunkins (born May 12, 1989), known professionally as Kelsey Lu, is an American singer and cellist based in Los Angeles, California.

Early life
Kelsey Lu was born in Charlotte, North Carolina, and had a strict Jehovah's Witness upbringing. Both of Lu's parents are musicians: their father is a percussionist, their mother a pianist. Their father's family hails from Nigeria. Lu began studying classical composition at age 6, learning piano, violin, and cello. At age 18, Lu left their family home to attend the University of North Carolina School of the Arts on a scholarship. A year later, they dropped out of the school.

Career
Kelsey Lu recorded their debut EP, Church, in a church in Greenpoint, Brooklyn. During this time, they toured with the band Wet as their opening act. They released Church in 2016. They released their debut album, Blood, in 2019. In that year, they also released Blood Transfusion, a collection of remixes of tracks from Blood.

Discography

Studio albums

Extended plays

Remix albums

Singles

Guest appearances

References

External links
 
 

1991 births
21st-century American singers
21st-century African-American women singers
Living people
Musicians from Charlotte, North Carolina
Singers from North Carolina
American cellists
American Jehovah's Witnesses
21st-century American women singers
21st-century cellists